The Davis Formation is a geologic formation in Indiana and Missouri. It preserves fossils dating back to the Cambrian period.

See also

 List of fossiliferous stratigraphic units in Indiana
 List of fossiliferous stratigraphic units in Missouri

References

 

Cambrian Indiana
Cambrian Missouri
Cambrian southern paleotemperate deposits
Cambrian southern paleotropical deposits